Sandstrom v. Montana, 442 U.S. 510 (1979), is a United States Supreme Court case that reaffirmed the prosecution's burden of proof of the mental element of a crime by striking down a jury instruction that "the law presumes that a person intends the ordinary consequences of his voluntary acts". In Francis v. Franklin,  471 U.S. 307 (1985), Justice Brennan wrote about "Sandstrom and the wellspring due process principal from which it is drawn" as follows: 
Sandstrom v. Montana made clear that the Due Process Clause of the Fourteenth Amendment prohibits a State from making use of jury instructions that have the effect of relieving the State of the burden of proof on the critical question of intent in a criminal prosecution.

References

External links
 

1979 in United States case law
United States Supreme Court cases
United States Supreme Court cases of the Burger Court